Melodifestivalen 2006 was the selection for the 46th song to represent Sweden at the Eurovision Song Contest. It was the 45th time that this system of picking a song had been used. Five heats had taken place to select the ten songs for the final, in Leksand, Karlstad, Karlskrona, Gothenburg and a Second Chance round in Stockholm. The final was broadcast on SVT1 and Sveriges Radio's P4 network. Carola Häggkvist was the clear favourite to win the final, with bookmakers making her the favourite and an Aftonbladet web poll showing her to have a clear margin over the other participants. The rehearsals sold out for the fourth year running; however, Carola was unable to perform in the final rehearsal due to throat problems. This led to speculation that the final would be closer than expected. Aftonbladet claimed in April 2006 that the televote may have been tampered with, as various sources reported unexplained voting (predominantly for Carola) on their telephone bills. It is clear that this would not have affected the result. Various finalists and heatists entered the Swedish Hitlistan chart after the competition. The second placed song, "Temple of Love", finished fourth in the Eurovision Madrid National Finals Song Contest.

Heats
The heats for Melodifestivalen 2006 began on 18 February 2006. Ten songs from these heats qualified for the final on 18 March 2006. This was the fifth year that a heat format had been used for the competition, and interest was higher than ever.

Preselection

On 15 August 2005 SVT confirmed that Leksand, Karlstad, Karlskrona and Gothenburg would host the heats of Melodifestivalen 2006, with the final taking place at the Stockholm Globe Arena for the fifth year running (sixth overall). SVT received 3,310 songs for the competition, a new record . The song titles were unveiled on 12 October, and the artists fifteen days later. Steven Simmonds took his song off the line-up in November 2005, stating that SVT were forcing him to sing it himself, which he did not want to do. Lena Philipsson was a surprise choice as host, as rumours had been spreading that SVT wanted Helena Paparizou to present the Gothenburg heat or the final. Bodies Without Organs were unveiled as the first wildcard in a pre-Christmas special. There was much speculation that Eurovision Song Contest 1999 winner Charlotte Perrelli would be among the others, but Magnus Carlsson, Rednex and Andreas Johnson were confirmed as wildcards in late January 2006. The proposed changes to the voting format (caused by the controversy over Nanne Grönvall's defeat in Melodifestivalen 2005) never materialised.

Contributions that didn't make it

Anna Book – Un, dos, trés
William Johansson – Ride on the Moonlight
Sanna Nielsen – Vägen hem
Shirley Clamp – Värsta schlagern
Maja Gullstrand – Alla dessa ord
Andrés Esteche – Midnight Train
Carola Szücs – It Was You

Other artists that submitted songs
Fredrik Wännman, Josefin Nilsson & Björn Kjellman, Pernilla Wahlgren, Elisabeth Andreassen, Lotta Engberg, Mikael Rickfors, Tommy Nilsson, Lustans Lakejer, Jan Johansen, Ann Winsborn, Emil Sigfridsson, Niklas Andersson, Rikard Wolff and The Wallstones.

Heat 1

Heat 2

Heat 3

Heat 4

Second Chance Round

Results

Juries

Televotes

Returning artists

See also
Eurovision Song Contest 2006
Sweden in the Eurovision Song Contest 2006

References

External links
Melodifestivalen 2006 official site (in Swedish)
Gylleneskor.se: Melodifestivalen 2006 (in Swedish, extensive coverage)
ESCSweden.com (in Swedish)
Information site about Melodifestivalen
Eurovision Song Contest National Finals
View the final online (Windows Media Player)
Melodifestivalen 2006 at the IMDB database

2006 in Swedish music
2006 Swedish television seasons
2006
Eurovision Song Contest 2006
2006 song contests
February 2006 events in Europe
March 2006 events in Europe
2000s in Stockholm
2000s in Gothenburg
Events in Stockholm
Events in Karlskrona
Events in Leksand